Gregory Lashon Wesley (born March 19, 1978) is a former American football safety in the National Football League. He played college football at University of Arkansas at Pine Bluff and was drafted by the Kansas City Chiefs in the third round of the 2000 NFL Draft.

Wesley has also been a member of the Oakland Raiders.

College career
He played in 33 games (22 starts) during his collegiate career at the University of Arkansas-Pine Bluff, totaling 121 tackles, nine tackles for a loss, eight interceptions, a fumble recovery, a forced fumble and 21 passes defensed.  Wesley was drafted in the 2000 NFL Draft by Kansas City in the 3rd round of the draft.

Professional career

Kansas City Chiefs
Wesley played eight seasons for the Kansas City Chiefs after being drafted by the team in the third round of the 2000 NFL Draft. During that time, he recorded 497 tackles (430 solo), six sacks, 56 defended passes, 11 forced fumbles and 29 interceptions (for 542 yards). In 2007, he lost his starting job with the Chiefs to safety Bernard Pollard.

On July 17, 2008, Wesley was released by the Chiefs.

Oakland Raiders
On July 22, 2008, Wesley signed with the Oakland Raiders, but was released on August 11, before appearing in any games.

NFL statistics

Personal life
Wesley's younger brother, Broderick Green, was a running back at the University of Southern California.  He transferred in Oct. 2008 and joined the University of Arkansas football team in 2009.

References

External links
Oakland Raiders bio

1978 births
Living people
Sportspeople from Little Rock, Arkansas
American football safeties
Arkansas–Pine Bluff Golden Lions football players
Kansas City Chiefs players
Oakland Raiders players